The Prva Liga, operated by the Football Association of Yugoslavia, began holding national competitions in 1923. This spawned many new opportunities for teams to be organized, and prospective footballers looking to join. The boom began right after the First World War, and continued well until the break out of the Second World War.

Following World War II, like in the rest of the communist block all teams were de jure dissolved and either restructured completely on the stalinist model of multi-section sport associations with new ideologically-friendly names and often completely new management, or simply kept dissolved and leaving a vacuum needing to be filled by new teams in their respective towns. Many of those oldest pre-World Wars teams are still in existence and turned to be the most successful teams in the former Yugoslavia.

Pre-World War I Clubs (Kingdom of Serbia and parts of Austria-Hungary)

Pre-World War II Clubs (Kingdom of Yugoslavia)

Post-War Clubs (Socialist Federal Republic of Yugoslavia)

See also
Yugoslav Cup
Yugoslav League Championship
Football Association of Yugoslavia

References

. 

 
Yugoslav culture
Society of Yugoslavia
Organizations based in Yugoslavia
History of Yugoslavia by topic
Yugoslavia sport-related lists